A. malayanus may refer to:

 Acanthopanax malayanus, a plant species
 Anthracoceros malayanus, a bird species

See also
 Malayanus